Ben Hancorn (born 24 May 1982) is an English former professional snooker player.

Career
In 2008, Hancorn was the runner up in the English Amateur Championship, losing the final to David Grace. Following this defeat Hancorn stopped playing snooker for a near 10-year hiatus before taking part again in the Challenge Tour.

In February 2020, Hancorn overcame Rory McLeod 5–3 in the final of the English Amateur Championship at the Centaur Arena in Cheltenham.

At the Q School 2020 – Event 2 at the English Institute of Sport in Sheffield, Hancorn beat the likes of Dean Reynolds and Chen Feilong, before seeing off Kuldesh Johal in the final round. With these wins Hancorn clinched a two-year Tour Card for the 2020–21 and 2021–22 snooker seasons.

In October 2020 Hancorn beat both Sean Maddocks and Thepchaiya Un-Nooh at the English Open to clinch his first 2 professional victories, before losing against Welshman Jak Jones in the round of 32. Hancorn was a surprise package at the 2021 WST Pro Series round robin first round with 6 consecutive victories, including a win against Ronnie O'Sullivan.

Performance and rankings timeline

Career finals

Amateur finals: 3 (1 title)

References 

1982 births
Living people
English snooker players
Sportspeople from Bristol